Rajkumar Kaiku (born ) is an Indian actor, who has appeared in Manipuri films. Kaiku made his film debut with the 2003 romantic film Kalpana. He has appeared in more than 400 Manipuri films.
Some of his films are Ta-Tomba the Great, Nungshit Mapi, and Mami. In addition to films, he has also worked in Shumang Kumhei including Border.

He contested the 2019 Parliamentary election in the Inner Manipur Lok Sabha Constituency as an independent candidate. In February 2022, he joined the Bharatiya Janata Party.

Early life and background

Kaiku was born on 3 January 1974 in Dimapur, Nagaland to RK Modhusana and RK Ongbi Reba. He passed his HSLC (High School Leaving Certificate) Examination undertaken by Board of Secondary Education, Manipur from Bengoon High School, Madrassa in the year 1995. He was a national level badminton player.  He did his graduation from DAV College, Chandigarh.
Before entering into the acting career, Kaiku married RK Ongbi Kiranmala. He has four daughters – Simran, Christina, Sana and Oprah.

Career
He started his career in acting since the early 2000s. The beginning of his career were marked by movies like Shaya, Hari Chandra, Lamhellabi Thamoisina, Thamoinungda, Mathang Mapokta and Mitki Kajal. In Hari Chandra, he played double roles of Hari and Chandra.

In Basantagee Nongallamdai (2006), he played the role of a student who falls in love with his teacher. The movie was a hit and his performance was well received by the audiences. He also starred in Bishwamittra's directorial venture Torei, which was shot in Manipur and Tawang, Arunachal Pradesh. Nanaakta Asum Asum was a movie where Kaiku had high hopes during the making but failed to reach his expectations when the film was released. He was the leading male protagonist in director O. Sanou's last movie Ee-Raang. In 2010, he played a drug addict in the movie Imagi Laman Singamdre. His 2012 film Hiktharaba Samji: Pizza, directed by Romi Meitei and produced by Jenny Khurai, was a hit.

In 2013, he was seen portraying the role of a doctorate degree holder in Homen D' Wai's comedy movie Dr. Hemogee Heloi. As of 2018, he starred in Sanagi Nga, a remake of the IMAA's famous Shumang Kumhei of the same title.

Accolades
Rajkumar Kaiku won the Best Actor Award - Male for his film Nongmatang at the Sahitya Seva Samiti Awards 2015. For the same movie, he bagged the Best Actor in a Leading Role - Male award at the 9th Manipur State Film Awards 2014.

He also won the Best Actor Award - Male for his role Khaba in the film Enakta Leiringei at the 11th Manipuri State Film Awards 2018.

Selected filmography

References 

Living people
21st-century Indian male actors
Indian male film actors
People from Imphal West district
Male actors from Manipur
1974 births
Shumang Kumhei artists